James Cuffe (1707 – 20 March 1762), of Elmhall and Ballinrobe, was an Irish landowner in County Mayo.

He was the son of Gerald Cuffe, who built Elmhall and his wife Dorothy Wynne, and grandson of Sir James Cuffe, who was granted the lands of Ballinrobe in 1667. On 30 April 1731 he married Elizabeth, daughter of Sir Arthur Gore, 2nd Baronet and Elizabeth Annesley; they were the parents of James Cuffe, 1st Baron Tyrawley and six other children.

In 1742 Cuffe succeeded his father-in-law as Member of Parliament for County Mayo in the Irish House of Commons, sitting until 1760.

References
 http://www.landedestates.ie/LandedEstates/jsp/estate-show.jsp?id=47
 https://web.archive.org/web/20090601105535/http://www.leighrayment.com/commons/irelandcommons.htm
 http://thepeerage.com/p33260.htm#i332596

1707 births
1762 deaths
People from County Mayo
Irish MPs 1727–1760
Members of the Parliament of Ireland (pre-1801) for County Mayo constituencies